The Kapiti Expressway is a four-lane grade-separated expressway on New Zealand's State Highway 1 route through the Kapiti Coast north of Wellington. From the northernmost terminus of the Transmission Gully Motorway at Mackays Crossing just north of Paekākāriki, it extends northwards  to just north of Ōtaki, bypassing the former two-lane route through Raumati South, Paraparaumu, Waikanae, Peka Peka, Te Horo and Ōtaki.

Construction
The section from just south of Mackays Crossing to just south of Poplar Avenue at Raumati South was completed in 2007 with the completion of the Mackays Crossing interchange and rail overbridge, bypassing the existing rail level crossing. The previously constructed four-lane section from Mackays Crossing to Poplar Avenue was upgraded during 2016 and early 2017 to provide an improved road surface. This section of road is constructed on an old peat swamp and develops an uneven surface over time.

Work on the Raumati to Peka Peka section started in December 2013. The official opening ceremony was held on 16 February 2017, and the expressway opened to traffic in the early hours of 24 February 2017, some three months ahead of the original scheduled date. Some works, including the final layer of asphalt on some sections and roundabouts at the Peka Peka and Poplar Avenue interchanges, took until mid-2017 to complete.

The first sod was turned on the 13 km Peka Peka to Ōtaki northern extension on 6 July 2017, and it opened to traffic on 22 December 2022.

Controversies
After 18 months it was apparent the road needed repairs. 49 kilometres of lanes were found to be leaking, due to the new type of low-sound asphalt that was used for its construction. This caused the road to crack and sink in many areas. When the New Zealand Transport Agency (NZTA) were asked, under an Official Information Act request, to provide information on the cause of the issues encountered they declined.

In July 2017 the Transport Minister Simon Bridges announced that an full Peka Peka Interchange would need to be built to connect the Waikanae North, Peka Peka and Te Horo Communities to the Kapiti Expressway. In January 2019, the NZTA announced plans to stop this project. An initiative was formed named "Finish our Road" focusing on the safety implications because higher traffic on local roads, impact on ratepayers subject to higher maintenance costs and impact on the rural communities of the Kapiti Coast. In May 2019, the Kapiti Coast District Council voted unanimously to back the goals of the initiative to review the business case provided by NZTA and their decision not to build the Peka Peka interchange.

History
The Kapiti Expressway has been constructed in two sections:

MacKays to Peka Peka (M2PP) was the first section to begin construction. The southern end linked SH 1 just north of Paekākāriki to with a two-lane highway towards Porirua City eventually linking with the four-lane Johnsonville–Porirua Motorway which was constructed in the 1960s. The northern end linked to the existing two-lane SH 1 from Peka Peka north towards Otaki, Levin and beyond.

In March 2022 the Transmission Gully Motorway was opened between MacKays and Linden. This bypassed the two-lane section of SH 1 and the former section became . This section is not officially part of the Kapiti Expressway.)

The Peka Peka to Ōtaki (PP2Ō) expressway section opened on 23 December 2022. At its official opening on 21 December Ngati Raukawa gifted the name Te Ara Tuku o Te Rauparaha, in honour of the legendary rangatira memorialised near the church Rangiātea in Ōtaki town.

A 24km expressway, from north of Ōtaki to north of Levin, is expected to begin construction in 2025 and opening around 2029.

Exit list

References

External links
Waka Kotahi – Mackays to Peka Peka (completed in 2017)
Waka Kotahi – Peka Peka to Ōtaki (opened 23 December 2022)
Waka Kotahi – Ōtaki to North of Levin (planning, construction to begin 2025)

Roads in New Zealand
State Highway 1 (New Zealand)
Transport in the Wellington Region
Kapiti Coast District